Raphael Udah (born September 1, 1989) is a Nigerian footballer. He currently plays for Duhok SC in the Iraqi Premier League.

References
 Veikkausliiga

1989 births
Living people
Nigerian footballers
Nigerian expatriate footballers
Expatriate footballers in Finland
Expatriate footballers in Iraq
Kuopion Palloseura players
Veikkausliiga players
Duhok SC players
Association football midfielders